Tegostoma florilegaria is a moth in the family Crambidae. It was described by Achille Guenée in 1857. It is found in Namibia and South Africa.

References

Odontiini
Moths described in 1857
Moths of Africa
Taxa named by Achille Guenée